Unsymmetrical dimethylhydrazine (UDMH; 1,1-dimethylhydrazine, НДМГ or codenamed Geptil) is a chemical compound with the formula H2NN(CH3)2 that is used as a rocket propellant. It is a colorless liquid, with a sharp, fishy, ammonia-like smell typical for organic amines. Samples turn yellowish on exposure to air and absorb oxygen and carbon dioxide. It is miscible with water, ethanol, and kerosene. In concentration between 2.5% and 95% in air, its vapors are flammable. It is not sensitive to shock.  Symmetrical dimethylhydrazine, 1,2-dimethylhydrazine is also known but is not as useful.

Production 
UDMH is produced industrially by two routes. Based on the Olin Raschig process, one method involves reaction of monochloramine with dimethylamine giving 1,1-dimethylhydrazinium chloride:
(CH3)2NH + NH2Cl → (CH3)2NNH2 ⋅ HCl

In the presence of suitable catalysts, acetylhydrazine can be N-dimethylated using formaldehyde and hydrogen to give the N,N-dimethyl-N'-acetylhydrazine, which can subsequently be hydrolyzed:
CH3C(O)NHNH2 + 2CH2O + 2H2 → CH3C(O)NHN(CH3)2 + 2H2O
CH3C(O)NHN(CH3)2 + H2O → CH3COOH + H2NN(CH3)2

Uses 
UDMH is often used in hypergolic rocket fuels as a bipropellant in combination with the oxidizer nitrogen tetroxide and less frequently with IRFNA (inhibited red fuming nitric acid) or liquid oxygen. UDMH is a derivative of hydrazine and is sometimes referred to as a hydrazine. As a fuel, it is described in specification MIL-PRF-25604 in the United States.

UDMH is stable and can be kept loaded in rocket fuel systems for long periods, which makes it appealing for use in many liquid rocket engines, despite its cost. In some applications, such as the OMS in the Space Shuttle or maneuvering engines, monomethylhydrazine is used instead due to its slightly higher specific impulse.
In some kerosene-fueled rockets, UDMH functions as a starter fuel to start combustion and warm the rocket engine prior to switching to kerosene.

UDMH has higher stability than hydrazine, especially at elevated temperatures, and can be used as its replacement or together in a mixture. UDMH is used in many European, Russian, Indian, and Chinese rocket designs. The Russian SS-11 Sego (aka 8K84) ICBM, SS-19 Stiletto (aka 15A30) ICBM, Proton, Kosmos-3M, R-29RMU2 Layner, R-36M, Rokot (based on 15A30) and the Chinese Long March 2F are the most notable users of UDMH (which is referred to as "heptyl" [codename from Soviet era] by Russian engineers). The Titan, GSLV, and Delta rocket families use a mixture of 50% hydrazine and 50% UDMH, called Aerozine 50, in different stages. There is speculation that it is the fuel used in the ballistic missiles that North Korea has developed and tested in 2017.

Safety 
Hydrazine and its methyl derivatives are toxic but LD50 values have not been reported. It is a precursor to dimethylnitrosamine, which is carcinogenic.
According to scientific data, usage of UDMH in rockets at Baikonur Cosmodrome has had adverse effects on the environment and local population.

See also 
 C-Stoff
 Aerozine 50
 Devil's venom

References

External links 
 Encyclopedia Astronautica
 CDC – NIOSH Pocket Guide to Chemical Hazards

Rocket fuels
Hydrazines